Dražen Zečić (born 24 July 1967) is a Croatian singer-songwriter. He was born in Split in 1967.

He initially began his career as a songwriter, writing for musicians such as Mate Bulić, Zlatko Pejaković, and Mišo Kovač. In 1990, he released his first album, and continues to be a popular artist today, especially in his native Dalmatia.

Albums
 Zagrli me noćas jače – 1990 (Suzy)
 Evo zore, evo dana – 1992 (Croatia Records)
 Govore mi mnogi ljudi – 1993 (Orfej)
 Boem u duši – 1995 (Croatia Records)
 Tamo gdje je srce – 1996 (Croatia Records)
 Dražen Zečić – live – (Scardona)
 Nitko nema dva života – 1998 (Croatia Records)
 Još se sjećam jedne žene – 1999 (Vjeverica/Croatia Records)
 Žnjan – u živo – 2000 (Scardona)
 Ti si život moj – 2001 (Croatia Records)
 U ime ljubavi – 2002 (Scardona)
 Pokidat ću lance sve – 2004 (Hit Records)
 Zora – 2006 (Hit Records)
 Oprosti svijete – 2007 (Croatia Records)
 U čast svim dobrim ljudima – 2009 (Croatia Records)
 Crni kralj i bijela dama – 2011 (Croatia Records)
 Tvoj ću ostati – 2013 (Croatia Records)

References

1967 births
Living people
Croatian pop singers
20th-century Croatian male singers
Musicians from Split, Croatia
21st-century Croatian male singers
Croatian nationalists